The 2010 season of the Meistriliiga, the first level in the Estonian football system, was the 20th season in the league's history. It started in March and ended in November. The defending champions were Levadia.

Overview

League table

Relegation play-off
The 9th placed team of Meistriliiga, Kuressaare, and the fourth place team of Esiliiga, Kiviõli Tamme Auto competed in a two-legged relegation play-off for one spot in 2011 Meistriliiga. Kuressaare won the play-off 4–2 on aggregate and retained their spot in the league.

Results
Each team played every opponent four times, twice at home and twice on the road, for a total of 36 games.

First half of season

Second half of season

Season Statistic

Miscellaneous
Oldest player: 45 years, 117 days – Aleksei Zhukov (Lootus v Kuressaare on 08/05/2010)
Youngest player: 16 years, 66 days – Alexei Cherkasov (Sillamäe Kalev v Trans on 06/11/2010)
Oldest goalscorer: 38 years, 207 days – Aleksei Naumov (Sillamäe Kalev v Flora on 28 August 2010)
Youngest goalscorer: 16 years, 216 days – Andreas Raudsepp (JK Viljandi Tulevik v Trans on 06/11/2010)

Season statistics

Top scorers

Awards

Monthly awards

Meistriliiga Player of the Year
Sander Post was named Meistriliiga Player of the Year.

See also
 2010 Esiliiga
 2009–10 Estonian Cup

References

External links
 Soccernet.ee 

Meistriliiga seasons
1
Estonia
Estonia